Muğdat Mosque (Camisif mosque in Mersin, Turkey. It is named after Miqdad ibn Aswad, one of the early Muslims.

Geography 
The mosque was built in 1980s in the Yenişehir second-level district of Mersin. Although the official name of the neighbourhood is Gazi, it is usually called Muğdat after the name of the mosque. The mosque is situated at the north of Mersin Archaeological Museum and the Mersin Naval Museum.

The building 
The mosque has a capacity to offer service to 5500 people. With this capacity it is the largest mosque in Mersin and the third largest mosque built during the Republican era of Turkey. It is also one of the three six-minaret mosques of Turkey. On each minaret there are three minaret balconies .

Muğdat mosque is actually a complex like the traditional Ottoman mosques. In addition to religious services, the mosque has facilities including a conference room, a library, a guest house a condolences room and a health center. The basement of the building is a supermarket.

Gallery

References

External links 
Photo gallery (Wowturkey)

Mosques in Mersin
Mosque buildings with domes
Yenişehir, Mersin
Mosques completed in 1998
20th-century religious buildings and structures in Turkey